Beatriz Patricia Ximena Allende Bussi (8 September 1942 – 11 October 1977) was a Chilean Socialist politician, revolutionary and surgeon. She was the daughter of former president of Chile Salvador Allende and his wife, Hortensia Bussi.

Biography
Known affectionately as Tati to her family and friends, she studied medicine at the University of Concepción and graduated as a surgeon. She married Cuban diplomat Luis Fernández de Oña and had two children, Maya Alejandra Fernández Allende (since 2014, a Chilean deputy) and Alejandro Salvador Allende Fernández.

When her father was elected as the president of Chile on 4 September 1970, Beatriz became his closest advisor and collaborator, networking with elements of the Chilean and international Left. During Pinochet's coup, despite being pregnant, she stayed with her father in La Moneda Presidential Palace, leaving only when President Allende ordered all women and children to evacuate. She was forced into exile with her mother, sisters and daughter to Cuba. While in exile in Havana, she served as executive secretary of the Anti-Imperialist Solidarity Committee.

Beatriz Allende worked at the Comité Chileno de Solidaridad Antiimperialista in La Habana as a secretary. Four years and one month after her father died and the 1973 Chilean coup d'état of Augusto Pinochet, she died by suicide with a firearm on October 11, 1977. Her body was buried in the Pantheon of Revolutionary Armed Forces in the Colon Cemetery in Havana.

Posthumous tributes 
To defend her figure, the militants of the Progressive Party of Chile decided to bear her name organizing in the Tati Allende Progressive Women's Front.This was released on October 11, 2018, on the anniversary of her death, accompanied by a song in her tribute composed by Mónica Berríos.

See also
 History of Chile

References

External links
Historical dictionary of Chile: 3rd Edition By Salvatore Bizzarro
 Last interview 
 Profile

1942 births
1977 suicides
20th-century Chilean women politicians
20th-century Chilean politicians
Beatriz
Chilean emigrants to Cuba
University of Concepción alumni
Chilean exiles
Chilean Marxists
Chilean people of Basque descent
Chilean people of Belgian descent
Chilean people of Italian descent
Chilean revolutionaries
Socialist Party of Chile politicians
Suicides by firearm in Cuba